Herd Runners is the third and final studio album by English band Cherry Ghost. It was released in May 2014 on Heavenly Recordings.

Track listing

References

2014 albums
Cherry Ghost albums
Heavenly Recordings albums